Abdulmutalib Al-Traidi is a Saudi Arabian footballer who plays as a right back.

References

External links
 

1982 births
Living people
Saudi Arabian footballers
Association football defenders
Saudi Arabian Shia Muslims
Saudi Professional League players
Saudi Second Division players
Saudi Fourth Division players
Ettifaq FC players
Ittihad FC players
Al-Qadsiah FC players
Khaleej FC players
Al-Fateh SC players
Al-Khuwaildiyah FC players
Al Safa FC players
Al-Hedaya Club players
Al-Salam SC (Saudi Arabia) players
Al-Noor FC players
Place of birth missing (living people)